The Community Oversight Board (COB) of Nashville, Tennessee is an independent body to review cases of alleged Metropolitan Nashville police misconduct. It appeared as Amendment 1 on the November 6, 2018 ballot in Davidson County and was approved by voters by a margin of 134,371 votes in support (58.81%) to 94,129 votes against (41.19%).

Members 
The board has 11 members: 7 nominated by community organizations or private petitions of at least 50 Davidson County residents, 2 by City Council Representatives, and 2 by the Mayor. At least 4 must come from economically distressed areas.

On January 22, 2019, the Metro Council appointed the first members of the COB. Of the Board's 11 initial members:

 7 were Black
 1 was Latino
 at least 2 identified as LGBT
 6 were women, 7 were men

As of October 2022, the Board was composed of:

 4 Black women
 3 Black men
 3 white men

Current officers:

 Chair: Michael Milliner
 First Vice Chair: Phyllis Hildreth
 Second Vice Chair: Shawn Whitsell
 Secretary: Andrew Goddard

Staff 
The COB is budgeted a staff of 15 employees to support the work and mission of the Board. The staff are colloquially referred to as Metro Nashville Community Oversight (MNCO). In FY22-23, MNCO was staffed at the following levels:

 (1) Executive Director
 (1) Assistant Director
 (1) Administrative Services Manager
 (1) Legal Advisor
 (5) Investigators
 (2) Research Analysts
 (1) Data and Evidence Technician
 (1) Community Liaison
 (1) Social Worker
 (1) Administrative Assistant

History 
The Amendment was proposed based on a petition by Community Oversight Now. The Fraternal Order of Police sued, claiming that the number of signatures on the petition was too low. However, the Davidson County Election Commission voted on August 15, 2018, to add it to the November 2018 ballot.

The Metro Council received more than 150 nominations for membership, and the Council's January 22, 2019, meeting to appoint members lasted 5 hours.

General Assembly pushback 
During the opening weeks of the 111th Tennessee General Assembly, many Republican leaders began openly debating limiting the powers of the Board. On February 4, 2019, Representative Michael Curcio (R-Dickson), the chairman of the House Judiciary Committee, announced he would be introducing legislation to eliminate the diversity requirements of the board, including any requirements based on employment history, economic status, or demographics. It would also revoke the board's subpoena power. This legislation would apply to any community oversight board in the state, not just Nashville's.

References

Further reading

External links 
 
 Community Oversight Now  - an advocacy organization
 Community Oversight Nashville - a coalition of advocacy groups
 

Organizations based in Nashville, Tennessee
Police oversight organizations
Government watchdog groups in the United States
Law enforcement in Tennessee
Liberal organizations